Adewale "Wally" Adeyemo (born May 20, 1981) is a Nigerian-American government official serving as the United States deputy secretary of the treasury. He was the first president of the Obama Foundation and also served during the Obama administration as the deputy national security advisor for international economics from 2015 to 2016 and deputy director of the National Economic Council.

Early life and education 
Adeyemo was born to Yoruba parents in Ibadan, Nigeria and raised in Southern California. His father was a teacher and his mother was a nurse. He has two younger siblings. After graduating from Eisenhower High School in Rialto, California in 1999, he received a Bachelor of Arts degree from the University of California, Berkeley in 2004 and a Juris Doctor degree from Yale Law School in 2009.

Early career 
Adeyemo served as the director of African American outreach for the John Kerry 2004 presidential campaign and was based in the San Francisco office.

Prior to joining the Obama administration, Adeyemo worked as an editor at the Hamilton Project. Adeyemo then served as senior advisor and deputy chief of staff to Jack Lew in the United States Department of the Treasury. Adeyemo later worked as a negotiator on the Trans-Pacific Partnership. He also served as the first chief of staff of the Consumer Financial Protection Bureau under Elizabeth Warren.

Obama Administration 
In November 2014, Adeyemo was nominated to be assistant secretary of the treasury for international markets and development at the same time that the incumbent assistant secretary, Marisa Lago, was nominated to be a deputy United States trade representative. He appeared before the Senate Committee on Banking, Housing, and Urban Affairs in September 2015, but the committee did not advance his nomination to the full Senate. The nomination was withdrawn by President Obama in December 2015. 

Adeyemo was instead selected to concurrently serve as deputy national security advisor for international economics and deputy director of the National Economic Council in 2015, serving until 2016. During his tenure, he was the president's representative to the G7 and G20 and held several senior management positions at the Department of the Treasury, including senior adviser and deputy chief of staff, and chief negotiator for the Trans-Pacific Partnership’s provisions on macroeconomic policy.

Out of government 
Adeyemo worked at BlackRock for two years from 2017, serving as a senior advisor, having previously been interim chief of staff for the firm's CEO, Laurence D. Fink. On August 1, 2019, Adeyemo was selected as the first president of the Obama Foundation.

Deputy Secretary of the Treasury

Nomination 
In November 2020, it was announced that Adeyemo would be nominated to serve as United States deputy secretary of the treasury in the Biden administration. On January 20, 2021, his nomination was submitted to the Senate for confirmation. A hearing before the Senate Committee on Finance was held on February 23, 2021; his nomination was reported out of committee by voice vote on March 3. On March 25, 2021, he was confirmed by the Senate, also by voice vote.

Tenure 
On March 26, 2021, he was sworn into office by Secretary Janet Yellen. Deputy Secretary Adeyemo has been heavily involved in sanctions enforcement in 2022, visiting and speaking with foreign regulators to encourage their cooperation.

References

External links

 

|-

|-

United States Deputy Secretaries of the Treasury
United States Deputy National Security Advisors
American people of Nigerian descent
American politicians of Nigerian descent
Biden administration personnel
Obama administration personnel
California lawyers
Yale Law School alumni
University of California, Berkeley alumni
Nigerian emigrants to the United States
American people of Yoruba descent
People from Los Angeles County, California
1981 births
Living people